David Myer Maurice (3 April 1922 in London – 20 July 2002 in Manhattan) was a British ophthalmologist, noted for his contributions to the development of the specular microscope used for examination of the cornea.

Biography
Maurice was educated at Highgate School from 1934 until 1939. He received in 1941 B.Sc. General and in 1942 B.Sc. Special (Physics) from the University of Reading. After WW II military service from 1942 to 1946 working on radar evasion, he received in 1951 his Ph.D. in physiology from University College London. From 1950 to 1968 he did research in ophthalmology at the Institute of Ophthalmology, University of London. From 1968 to 1993 he was a senior scientist and then professor of ophthalmology at Stanford University Medical School. From 1993 to 1996 he was a professor of ocular physiology in the Department of Ophthalmology in the College of Physicians and Surgeons, Columbia University. From 1996 to 2002 he was an adjunct professor of ocular physiology in the Department of Ophthalmology, Columbia University. For the academic year 1951–1952 he was a British Council Scholar at the University of Rome. For the academic year 1957–1958 he was a Fulbright Fellow at the University of California, San Francisco. For the academic year 1979–1980 he was a Guggenheim Fellow at the University of Paris.

His PhD thesis on corneal permeability introduced the pump-leak hypothesis for the corneal endothelium. At the Institute of Ophthalmology in London, he worked on the explanation of the physical basis of corneal transparency, aqueous humor dynamics, and other topics in the physiology of the eye. He introduced fluorescein for the investigation of aqueous humor flow, now an important technique in ocular research.

He was a founding member of the journal Experimental Eye Research (first issue published in 1961) and a member of its editorial board until 2001. In 1998 he published a theory of REM-sleep oxygen supply to the cornea.

Upon his death he was survived by his wife, his ex-wife, three daughters, and five grandchildren.

Honours and awards
1967 — Friedenwald Memorial Award from the Association for Research in Ophthalmology
1981 — George Smelser Memorial Lecturer at Columbia University, New York
1984 — Ida Mann Lecturer at Oxford University, U.K.
1985 — Claes Dohlman Lecturer at the Massachusetts Eye and Ear Infirmary
1985 — Lacrima Award from the Dry Eye Society
1986 — Castroviejo Lecturer at the Castroviejo Society
1988–1992 — President of the International Society of Ocular Fluorophotometry
1989 — Charles F. Prentice Memorial Medal from the American Academy of Optometry
1992 — W. Williamson Memorial Lecturer at the University of Manchester, U.K.
1996 — Von Sallmann Prize in Vision and Ophthalmology
2001 — Diaz Caneja Award from the University of Valladolid, Spain
2003 — Helen Keller Prize for Vision Research (posthumous award)

References

1922 births
2002 deaths
British ophthalmologists
People educated at Highgate School
Alumni of the University of Reading
Alumni of University College London
Stanford University faculty
Columbia University faculty
20th-century British inventors
British military personnel of World War II
British expatriates in France
British expatriates in the United States